The Nipmuc Nation was a non profit entity of the state-recognized tribe of Nipmuc people, an Indigenous people of the Northeastern Woodlands based in South Grafton, Massachusetts. They are the only state-recognized tribe in Massachusetts, according to the National Conference of State Legislators.

The Nipmuc Nation also used to work with the Chaubunagungamaug Nipmuck, of Worcester County, Massachusetts. Most of the group's more than 500 members live in and around Chaubunagungamaug Reservation, Hassanamisco Reservation and the city of Worcester. Cheryll Toney Holley was elected as the chief of the Hassanamisco Nipmuc Band in 2013.

In 2004, the Bureau of Indian Affairs determined that this group did not meet four of the seven mandatory requirements to be a federally recognized tribe.

Nonprofit 
The Nipmuc Nation founded a 501(c)(3) nonprofit organization,  the Nipmuc Nation Tribal Council, Inc., based in South Grafton, Massachusetts, in 1998.

Status determination
The following is based upon "Proposed Finding Against Federal Acknowledgment of the Webster/Dudley Band of Chaubunagungamaug Nipmuck Indians" (Oct. 2001) and reiterated in the "Final Determination to Decline Federal Acknowledgment of The Nipmuck Nation" (June 2004) and as such represents the views of the Department of the Interior and may differ from the views of Nipmuc Nation representatives.  Note also that the following delineates the determinations which were unmet rather than those that were satisfied.

The historical tribe with which the Nipmuc Nation group asserts continuity was the Hassanamisco Nipmuc of southeastern Worcester County, Massachusetts. The land was not the common property of a tribal entity and the State did not hold title to the reserved Hassanamisco property. There was no common fund but each property-owning family got a share in the funds received from the sale of the land.

The historical Hassanamisco Indians were affected by the Massachusetts Enfranchisement Act of 1869, an act which "detribalized" the historical Hassanamisco Indians and temporarily ended the State's relationship with them.

At the time of the petition, the Nipmuc Nation group had 526 members. The Federal government rejected the Nipmuc Nation's argument that it has had continuous State recognition with a reservation. This is the land in the Town of Grafton that is known as the "Hassanamisco Reservation."

The Bureau of Indian Affairs determined that only two percent of the current membership of the Nipmuck Nation group descends from the historical Hassanamisco Indians.  For at least 107 years, there was no State-recognized Indian entity and no State supervision. A limited relationship was created between the Nipmuc Nation and the Commonwealth of Massachusetts after the establishment of the Massachusetts Commission on Indian Affairs (MCIA) in 1976.

As such, the Nipmuc Nation does not meet the Federal criterion which requires that it has been identified as an American Indian entity on a substantially continuous basis since 1900. For the period from 1900 to 1979, there were no external identifications of a Nipmuck entity broader than some of the Hassanamisco proprietary descendants.

The Nipmuc Nation group does not meet the Federal criterion which requires that a predominant portion of the petitioning group comprise a distinct community from historical times until the present. From 1785 through the early 1950s there continued to be a limited community made up of some of the descendants of the original Hassanamisco families residing in Grafton and in the city of Worcester, Massachusetts but only two percent of the Nipmuc petitioner's members descend from the Hassanamisco property-owning families.

It was not sufficiently proven that a community of Webster/Dudley Indian descendants and other Indians ancestral to the petitioner's members had coalesced around some of those Hassanamisco families by the 1920s.  During the 1920s and 1930s there was some limited interaction in the context of pan-Indian organizations which also had non-Nipmuc and non-Indian members. The petitioner's ancestors did not constitute a distinct community from the 1920s through the 1950s.

During the 1960s and 1970s, Zara Cisco Brough, then the owner of the Hassanamisco Reservation property, created a number of lists of Nipmuc Indians. The evolving governing documents and membership lists of the period from 1961 through 1979 expanded the definition of the Nipmuck group beyond the Hassanamisco to include families which had little or no previous contact with one another. The wide fluctuation in membership, both in size and component family lines, was indicative of a non-distinct community.

The available evidence did not indicate to the government's satisfaction that the Nipmuc Nation  maintained political influence over its members as an autonomous entity from historical times until the present.  Also, during all of the 19th century, the ancestors of 98 percent of the Nipmuck Nation's members were not affiliated either with the Hassanamisco Indians or with one another.

Two percent of the members (which is 11 out of 526) descend from the historical Hassanamisco/Grafton Nipmuck tribe that was identified on the Earle Report in 1861.  Fifty-three percent of the members (277 of 526) descend from six families ('Jaha, Humphrey, Belden, Pegan/Wilson, Pegan, Sprague) that were identified as Dudley/Webster Indians in 1861. Thirty-four percent of the members have Indian ancestry from an individual identified as a "Miscellaneous Indian" on the Earle Report, eight percent descend from Connecticut Indians, and three percent have other Indian ancestry.

Therefore, 45 percent of the Nipmuc Nation does not have documented ancestry from either the historical Hassanamisco tribe or the historical Dudley/Webster tribe.  Neither the two percent of the members who descend from the Hassanamisco tribe nor the 53 percent who descend from the separate Dudley/Webster tribe is sufficient, based on precedent, to meet the Federal requirements of criterion for descent from a historical tribe.

See also 
 Native American tribes in Massachusetts

References

External links 
 
 Hassanamisco Indian Museum, Grafton, MA

 Native American tribes in Massachusetts
Nipmuc
State-recognized tribes in the United States
 Worcester County, Massachusetts